Malgrate is a comune (municipality) in the Province of Lecco, in the Italian region Lombardy. Malgrate is located across from Lecco, from which it is geographically divided by the Lake Como.

Malgrate, located after Lecco to the West, is one of the gates of the Brianza. Malgrate  borders  Galbiate, where in Figina, (in the current territory of Villa Vergano,  a frazione  of Galbiate),  appears the first written mention of the name Brianza. Malgrate  borders also  the following municipalities:  Lecco and  Valmadrera.

In ancient Roman times, the town was known as Antesitum.

It is the birthplace of Angelo Scola (born 7 November 1941), a Cardinal of the Catholic Church, philosopher, and theologist.

Twin towns
Malgrate is twinned with:

  Lavarone, Italy

References

External links
 Malgrate official municipality site 
 Antesitum - Oblique visions from the opposite of Lecco
 Italian Wikipedia article

Cities and towns in Lombardy